The Canadian Wood Council (CWC) was founded in 1959 and represents the Canadian wood products industry through a national federation of associations.

References 

Business organizations based in Canada